Walter Schmidt (born August 7, 1948 in Lahr, Baden-Württemberg) is a retired male hammer thrower from West Germany, who was one of the leading athletes in his discipline in the 1970s, setting two world records. He ended up in fifth place at the 1976 Summer Olympics in Montreal, Quebec, Canada.

References
 Year Ranking

1948 births
Living people
People from Lahr
Sportspeople from Freiburg (region)
German male hammer throwers
Athletes (track and field) at the 1976 Summer Olympics
Olympic athletes of West Germany
Universiade medalists in athletics (track and field)
Universiade silver medalists for West Germany
Medalists at the 1975 Summer Universiade